Yu Jiaju (1898-1976) was a Chinese educator and social advocate.

Biography 
Yu was born to a scholarly family in Huangpi County, Hubei, Republic of China. He studied education at Beijing Normal University, and was later funded by the Chinese Ministry of Education to study in the UK, first in the University of London before transferring to the University of Edinburgh. He returned to China in 1924 to serve as head of the Department of Education at Wuchang University. In 1937, he became the head of the Department of Education at Henan University.

Yu was a member of the Young China Association and was instrumental in the 1920s Educational Rights Movement. He particularly attacked Christian educational institutions as impinging on Chinese nationalism.

After 1949, Yu moved to Taiwan and died there on May 12, 1976.

References 

1898 births
1976 deaths
Educators from Hubei